Baisikeli Ugunduzi is a for-profit social business that specializes in bicycle components for the Sub-Saharan African market. Baisikeli Ugunduzi means innovative or modern bicycles in Swahili. It was founded in the winter of 2011 by Ben Mitchell, whom holds a MS in mechanical engineering as is currently seeking his PhD at Michigan Technological University and John Gershenson, a professor of mechanical engineering at MTU. Baisikeli Ugunduzi is headquartered in Kitale, Kenya, Africa. It is considered a for-profit social venture, where it develops human-centered products, which seeks to raise the income of boda boda, who rely on the bicycle as a means of livelihood.

Funding
Baisikeli Ugunduzi was awarded $100,000 in Development Innovation Ventures (DIV) stage 1 funding from USAID.  The enterprise won first place in the Central Michigan University New Venture Competition, worth $30,000, plus an additional $10,000 for Best Social Venture, was awarded "Top 40 Project 2012" in the Dell Social Innovation Challenge, and was a semi-finalist for an Echoing Green Fellowship.  A campaign to raise $40,000 in 40 days on Indiegogo, however, was unsuccessful.
In April 2014, Baisikeli Ugunduzi placed third in the Global Social Venture Challenge where they were awarded $7,500.

Product
Their first product is a bicycle tire inner tube replacement made of an elastic material, called the Milele Tube, which cannot go flat. Milele means forever in Swahili. It is a solid, cylindrical piece of elastic material that replaces the standard inner tube and can be cut to length to fit any size tire. It is being made with three different firmness levels. There is a soft tube for the front tire, which carries less of the total load; a medium tube for light loads on the rear; and a firm tube for heavy loads such as passengers or cargo. The first day of sales was April 6, 2013.

Market
More than 5 million people in Sub-Saharan Africa depend on bicycles to earn a living, such as boda boda operators, and they can spend up to a quarter of their incomes just to fix flat tires. Traditional bicycle tubes cost $3, and the Milele tube cost just over $10, but can last up to five years.

See also
 Bikes Not Bombs
 Bikes to Rwanda
 Cardboard bicycle
 Pedaling to Freedom
 With My Own Two Wheels
 World Bicycle Relief

References

External links
www.baisikeliugunduzi.com

Social enterprises